GVSU Fieldhouse Arena is a 4,200-seat indoor arena located in Allendale, Michigan, a suburb of Grand Rapids, on the campus of Grand Valley State University.  It was built in the early 1980s as the home of the Grand Valley State University Lakers basketball and volleyball teams, as it remains to this day. The current fieldhouse replaced the former one when the roof of the "Dome" over the arena became unstable and was condemned.

The  fieldhouse was created as a multipurpose facility; in addition to intercollegiate events, it is also used for intramural sports, trade shows, meetings, conventions, commencement ceremonies and concerts.  The arena seats up to 5,900 for concerts; the arena floor measures .  It is located in the northwest part of campus along with most all other athletics facilities.

Laker Nation
Laker Nation, Grand Valley's student section for all sports, typically has a large attendance present at sporting events held in the GVSU Fieldhouse Arena.

Notable performances
(Former and present fieldhouse)
Aerosmith
REO Speedwagon
Santana
the Eagles
Frank Zappa
Hoodie Allen
Hillary Clinton
Peter Frampton
Ted Nugent
Bill Cosby
Hellogoodbye
The Black Eyed Peas
Motion City Soundtrack
Steve Aoki
Dan + Shay
All Time Low
INXS
Chris Rock
Yung Gravy

References

External links
Grand Valley State University Fieldhouse

Sports venues in Michigan
Grand Valley State University
Indoor arenas in Michigan
College basketball venues in the United States
Allendale, Michigan
Sports venues in Ottawa County, Michigan
Convention centers in Michigan
Basketball venues in Michigan
1980s establishments in Michigan
College volleyball venues in the United States